The Type 345 (MR35) fire-control radar system is used to guide the HQ-7 short-range surface-to-air missile.  The system is installed on many modern, and retrofitted Chinese navy ships.

The Type 345 fire control radar appears to be based on the Thomson-CSF Castor CTM (Conduite de Tir Multisensor) fire control radar which is a Castor II/J with a separate IR camera (Piraña) and TV tracker and not the oft quoted Castor IIC. It is possible however, that the Castor IIC was bought initially but the CTM was also bought later.

It uses a TWT transmitter with a Cassegrain antenna. Pulse compression (7.5 μs pulse) and pulse Doppler processing (first blind speed 1000 m/s) techniques are used and it can acquire ASHM at 18 km and fighter at 30 km with tracking range between 350 m and 30 km.

Specifications
 System: Radar+ IR compound tracking
 Band: Ku band
 IR: 3~5 μm & 8~12 μm
 Range performance: 30 km against 2 m² RCS aircraft ; 15 km against sea-skimming target
 Radar beam width: 1.2°
 IR FOV: 1.3° X 1°
 Tracking coverage: 360° (Az); -30°~85° (El)
 Tracking Radar
Frequency: Ku band
Polarization:	Horizontal
 Antenna type: Cassegrain antenna
IR Tracker
Spectral band	3~5 μm
Pixel Resolution: 320x240
FOV: 1.3° X 1°
Transmitter
Antenna gain: 21 dB
Beam width: Wide 20°, Narrow 3°
Ambient temperature
Antenna: -25–+70 °C
Power supply
115 V/50 Hz 3-phase AC: 5 kW
115 V/400 Hz 3-phase AC: 1 kW

External links
Long Range Ground Surveillance Radar Systems With IR Compound Tracking System

See also
 Type 052 Luhu class destroyer
 Type 051B Luhai class destroyer
 Type 053H Jiangwei class frigate

Naval radars
Military radars of the People's Republic of China